The Big Dipper (US, Canada) or the Plough (UK, Ireland) is a large asterism consisting of seven bright stars of the constellation Ursa Major; six of them are of second magnitude and one, Megrez (δ), of third magnitude. Four define a "bowl" or "body" and three define a "handle" or "head". It is recognized as a distinct grouping in many cultures.  The North Star (Polaris), the current northern pole star and the tip of the handle of the Little Dipper (Little Bear), can be located by extending an imaginary line through the front two stars of the asterism, Merak (β) and Dubhe (α). This makes it useful in celestial navigation.

Names and places

The constellation of Ursa Major (Latin: Greater Bear) has been seen as a bear, a wagon, or a ladle. The "bear" tradition is Indo-European (appearing in Greek, as well as in Vedic India), but apparently the name "bear" has parallels in Siberian or North American traditions.

European astronomy
The name "Bear" is Homeric, and apparently native to Greece, while the "Wain" tradition is Mesopotamian.
Book XVIII of Homer's Iliad mentions it as "the Bear, which men also call the Wain". In Latin, these seven stars were known as the "Seven Oxen" (from ). Classical Greek mythography identified the "Bear" as the nymph Callisto, changed into a she-bear by Hera, the jealous wife of Zeus.

In Ireland and the United Kingdom, this pattern is known as the Plough (Irish: An Camchéachta – the bent plough). The symbol of the Starry Plough has been used as a political symbol by Irish Republican and left wing movements. Former names include the Great Wain (i.e., wagon), Arthur's Wain or Butcher's Cleaver. The terms Charles's Wain and Charles his Wain are derived from the still older Carlswæn. A folk etymology holds that this derived from Charlemagne, but the name is common to all the Germanic languages and the original reference was to the churls' (i.e., the men's) wagon, in contrast to the women's wagon, (the Little Dipper). An older "Odin's Wain" may have preceded these Nordic designations.

In German, it is known as the "Great Wagon" and, less often, the "Great Bear". Likewise, in the North Germanic languages, it is known by variations of "Charles's Wagon" (Karlavagnen, Karlsvogna, or Karlsvognen), but also the "Great Bear" (Stora Björn), and to the Norse pagans, it was known as Óðins vagn; "Woden's wagon".. In Dutch, its official name is the "Great Bear" (Grote Beer), but it is popularly known as the "Saucepan" (Steelpannetje). In Italian, it is called either the "Great Wagon" (Grande Carro) or "Orsa Maggiore" ("Greater Bear").

Romanian and most Slavic languages also call it the "Great Wagon". In Hungarian, it is commonly known as "Göncöl's Wagon" or, less often, "Big Göncöl" after a táltos (shaman) in Hungarian mythology who carried medicine that could cure any disease. In Finnish, the figure is known as Otava with established etymology in the archaic meaning 'salmon net', although other uses of the word refer to 'bear' and 'wheel'. The bear relation is claimed to stem from the animal's resemblance to—and mythical origin from—the asterism rather than vice versa.

In Lithuanian, the stars of Ursa Major are known as Didieji Grįžulo Ratai ("The Big Back Wheels"). Other names for the constellation include Perkūno Ratai ("The Wheels of Perkūnas"), Kaušas ("The Bucket"), Vežimas ("The Carriage"), and Samtis ("The Ladle").

In the Sámi languages of Northern Europe, the constellation is identified as the bow of the great hunter Fávdna (the star Arcturus). In the main Sámi language, North Sámi it is called Fávdnadávgi ("Fávdna's bow") or simply dávggát ("the bow"). The constellation features prominently in the Sámi national anthem, which begins with the words Guhkkin davvin dávggáid vuolde sabmá suolggai Sámieanan, which translates to "Far to the north, under the Bow, the Land of the Sámi slowly comes into view." The Bow is an important part of the Sámi traditional narrative about the night sky, in which various hunters try to chase down Sarva, the Great Reindeer, a large constellation that takes up almost half the sky. According to the legend, Fávdna stands ready to fire his Bow every night but hesitates because he might hit Stella Polaris, known as Boahji ("the Rivet"), which would cause the sky to collapse and end the world.

Asian traditions

In Chinese astronomy and Chinese constellation records, The Big Dipper is called "Beidou", literally means Northern Dipper. It refers to an asterism equivalent to the Big Dipper. The Chinese name for Alpha Ursae Majoris is Beidou Yi and Tianshu. The asterism name was mentioned in Warring States period (c. 475–221 BCE) stellar records, in which the asterism is described to have seven stars in the shape of a dipper or a chariot.

The Chinese astronomy records were translated to other East Asian cultures in the Sinosphere. The most prominent name is the "Northern Dipper" and the "Seven Stars of the Northern Dipper". In astrology, these stars are generally considered to compose the Right Wall of the Purple Forbidden Enclosure which surrounds the Northern Celestial Pole, although numerous other groupings and names have been made over the centuries. Similarly, each star has a distinct name, which likewise has varied over time and depending upon the asterism being constructed. The personification of the Big Dipper itself is also known as "Doumu" in Chinese folk religion and Taoism, and Marici in Buddhism.

In Vietnam, the colloquial name for the asterism is Sao Bánh lái lớn (The Big Rudder Stars), contrasted with Ursa Minor, which is known as Sao Bánh lái nhỏ (The Little Rudder Stars). Although this name has now been replaced by the Sino-Vietnamese "Bắc Đẩu" in everyday speech, many coastal communities in central and southern Vietnam still refer to the asterism as such and use it to navigate when their fishing vessels return from the sea at night.

In Shinto religion, the seven largest stars of Ursa Major belong to Amenominakanushi, the oldest and most powerful of all kami.

In Malay, it is known as the "Boat Constellation"; in Indonesian, as the "Canoe Stars" (Bintang Biduk).

In Burmese, these stars are known as Pucwan Tārā (ပုဇွန် တာရာ, pronounced "bazun taja"). Pucwan (ပုဇွန်) is a general term for a crustacean, such as prawn, shrimp, crab, lobster, etc.

While its Western name come from the star pattern's resemblance to a kitchen ladle, in Filipino, the Big Dipper and its sister constellation the Little Dipper are more often associated with the tabo, a one-handled water pot used ubiquitously in Filipino households and bathrooms for purposes of personal hygiene.

In the earliest Indian astronomy, the Big Dipper was called "the Bear" (Ṛkṣa) in the Rigveda, but was later more commonly known by the name of Saptarishi, "Seven Sages."

Inuit traditions 
In Inuit astronomy, the same grouping of stars is referred to as "the Caribou" (Tukturjuit). Many of the stars within the constellation "were used as hour hands on the night sky to indicate hours of the night, or as calendar stars to help determine the date in fall, winter, or spring."

In North America 
The asterism name "Big Dipper" is mostly used in the United States and Canada. However, the origin of the term is disputed. A popular myth claimed the name originated from African-American folk songs, however, more recent source challenges the authenticity of the claim.

Stars
Within Ursa Major the stars of the Big Dipper have Bayer designations in consecutive Greek alphabetical order from the bowl to the handle.

In the same line of sight as Mizar, but about one light-year beyond it, is the star Alcor (80 UMa). Together they are known as the "Horse and Rider".  At fourth magnitude, Alcor would normally be relatively easy to see with the unaided eye, but its proximity to Mizar renders it more difficult to resolve, and it has served as a traditional test of sight. Mizar itself has four components and thus enjoys the distinction of being part of an optical binary as well as being the first-discovered telescopic binary (1617) and the first-discovered spectroscopic binary (1889).

Five of the stars of the Big Dipper are at the core of the Ursa Major Moving Group. The two at the ends, Dubhe and Alkaid, are not part of the swarm, and are moving in the opposite direction. Relative to the central five, they are moving down and to the right in the map. This will slowly change the Dipper's shape, with the bowl opening up and the handle becoming more bent. In 50,000 years the Dipper will no longer exist as we know it, but be re-formed into a new Dipper facing the opposite way. The stars Alkaid to Phecda will then constitute the bowl, while Phecda, Merak, and Dubhe will be the handle.

Guidepost

Not only are the stars in the Big Dipper easily found themselves, they may also be used as guides to yet other stars. Thus it is often the starting point for introducing Northern Hemisphere beginners to the night sky:
Polaris, the North Star, is found by imagining a line from Merak (β) to Dubhe (α) and then extending it for five times the distance between the two Pointers.
Extending a line from Megrez (δ) to Phecda (γ), on the inside of the bowl, leads to Regulus (α Leonis) and Alphard (α Hydrae). A mnemonic for this is "A hole in the bowl will leak on Leo."
Extending a line from Phecda (γ) to Megrez (δ) leads to Thuban (α Draconis), which was the pole star 4,000 years ago. 
Crossing the top of the bowl from Megrez (δ) to Dubhe (α) takes one in the direction of Capella (α Aurigae).  A mnemonic for this is "Cap to Capella."
Castor (α Geminorum) is reached by imagining a diagonal line from Megrez (δ) to Merak (β) and then extending it for approximately five times that distance.
By following the curve of the handle from Alioth (ε) to Mizar (ζ) to Alkaid (η), one reaches Arcturus (α Boötis) and Spica (α Virginis). A mnemonic for this is "Arc to Arcturus then speed (or spike) to Spica."
Additionally, the Dipper may be used as a guide to telescopic objects:
The approximate location of the Hubble Deep Field can be found by following a line from Phecda (γ) to Megrez (δ) and continuing on for the same distance again.
Crossing the bowl diagonally from Phecda (γ) to Dubhe (α) and proceeding onward for a similar stretch leads to the bright galaxy pair M81 and M82.
Two spectacular spiral galaxies flank Alkaid (η), the Pinwheel (M101) to the north and the Whirlpool (M51) to the south.
Projecting a line from Alkaid (η) through the pole star will point to Cassiopeia.

Cultural associations

The "Seven Stars" referenced in the Bible's Book of Amos may refer to these stars or, more likely, to the Pleiades.

In addition, the asterism has also been used in corporate logos and the Alaska flag. 
The seven stars on a red background of the Flag of the Community of Madrid, Spain, are the stars of the Big Dipper Asterism. The same can be said about the seven stars pictured in the bordure azure of the Coat of arms of Madrid, capital city of Spain.

The asterism's prominence on the north of the night sky produced the adjective "septentrional" (literally, pertaining to seven plow oxen) in Romance languages and English, meaning "Northern [Hemisphere]".

"Follow the Drinkin' Gourd" is an African American folk song first published in 1928. The "Drinkin' Gourd" is thought to refer to the Big Dipper.  Folklore has it that escaped southern slaves in the United States used the Big Dipper as a point of reference to go north.

The Constellation was also used on the flag of the Italian Regency of Carnaro within the Ouroboros.

See also
 Abenaki mythology
 Amenominakanushi
 Apkallu
 Saptarishi
 Seven Sages of Greece
 Swastika symbols
 Taidi

References

 
Asterisms (astronomy)
Ursa Major (constellation)